A coat is an outer garment worn on the upper body for warmth or fashion.

Coat may also refer to:
 
Coat, a layer of a certain substance, usually paint
Animal coat, the natural fur coat of an animal
Dog coat, the natural hair coat of a dog
Coat of arms, a heraldic design used to identify a nation, city, family, or individual
Lounge coat, another term for the lounge jacket as part of a lounge suit
Rug (animal covering), also known as an animal coat, an article of clothing for animals
Cindy Coat, French female canoeist

See also
 Coate (disambiguation)
 Coats (disambiguation)
 Cote (disambiguation)

nl:Jas